Myfanwy is a feminine given name that may refer to:

 Myfanwy Ashmore (born 1970), Canadian artist
 Myfanwy Bekker, South African artist
 Myfanwy Fychan (born mid-14th century), Welsh noblewoman, subject of many poems
 Myfanwy Haycock (1913–1963), Welsh poet
 Myfanwy Horne (1933–2013), Australian journalist, writer, reviewer and book editor
 Myfanwy Howell, Welsh television broadcaster
 Myfanwy Macleod (born 1961), Canadian artist
 Myfanwy Pavelic (1916–2007), Canadian portrait painter
 Myfanwy Piper (1911–1997), British art critic and opera librettist
 Myfanwy Pryce (1890–1976), Welsh novelist and short story writer
 Myfanwy Talog (1944–1995), Welsh actress
 Myfanwy Warhurst (born 1973), Australian radio announcer
 Myfanwy Waring (born 1974), Welsh actress

Welsh feminine given names